Richard Mark Toy is a retired United States Army major general who served as the Chief of Staff of the United Nations Command from August 10, 2020, to June 2022. He previously served as the Commanding General of the Mississippi Valley Division from August 16, 2019, to June 2020.

References

Living people
Year of birth missing (living people)
Place of birth missing (living people)
Recipients of the Distinguished Service Medal (US Army)
Recipients of the Legion of Merit
United States Army generals
United States Army personnel of the Iraq War
United States Army personnel of the War in Afghanistan (2001–2021)